The following is a list of Army Black Knights men's basketball head coaches. The Black Knights have had 31 head coaches in their 121-season history.

Army's current head coach is Jimmy Allen. He was hired in April 2016 to replace Zach Spiker, who left to take the head coach position at Drexel.

References

Army

Army Black Knights men's basketball coaches